Carolynne Willey (née Good; born 5 August 1980) is a British singer-songwriter, actress and former model from Leeds, England. She is a founding member of the Carolynne Good Band, based in Leeds and London. She is best known for finishing in third place on the second series of the BBC singing competition Fame Academy in 2003. In 2011, Willey was a contestant on The X Factor and made it to the judges' houses' stage of the competition. She returned to the show the following series in 2012 and made it to the live shows, but was eliminated after the first live show following a sing-off against Rylan Clark.

Early and personal life
Carolynne Good was born in Leeds, Yorkshire. She attended Pudsey Grangefield High School.

She was previously married to footballer David Poole. In August 2015, Good announced that she was in a relationship with England cricketer David Willey, whom she married in November 2016.

Singing career

1998–2001: Early career
Poole's early musical influences included The Eagles, U2, The Carpenters, and Mary Chapin Carpenter. In 1998, having moved from Leeds to London to pursue a career as a singer-songwriter, she was one of the final 15 in auditions for S Club 7, along with Pop Idol contestant Zoe Birkett. The following year, Poole joined and fronted a five-member country music band, with which she toured the UK. In 2001, she signed her first publishing contract with BMG Music Publishing. In 2000, she continued to develop her songwriting talents in the UK and Europe. She split most of her time between London and Stockholm, writing for other recording artists, writing and recording with different songwriters and producers.

2003–05: Fame Academy, songwriting and touring
In 2003, Poole appeared in the second series of the BBC's singing competition Fame Academy, in which she reached the final. A song she co-wrote with fellow contestants Alex Parks and James Fox, titled "Not Your Average Kind of Girl", was included on Parks' 2003 debut album Introduction. The album reached number 5 on the UK Albums Chart and has since been classified 2x Platinum in the UK, and gold in six other countries including Italy, Greece, Germany, and Australia.

Poole spent 2004 continuing to writing songs, and in the next year toured the UK with Tony Christie. Under the wing of Christie's Amarillo Music, she co-wrote new material and formed the Carolynne Good Band in 2005 with songwriter/bassist Don Rogers, drummer Sean Fitzgerald, guitarists Alex Rogers and Alex Sharman from the London-based band Starling, and keyboard player Maki. The band described their sound as "a mixture of classic singer-songwriter melodies with a country flavour."

2011–12: The X Factor

In 2011, Poole auditioned for the eighth series of The X Factor. She reached the "judges' houses" stage, where Louis Walsh was her mentor in the "over 25s" category, but failed to progress through to the live shows, with Walsh instead choosing Johnny Robinson, Kitty Brucknell, Jonjo Kerr and Goldie Cheung (who later dropped out and was replaced by Sami Brookes).

Poole auditioned again for the ninth series, and made it to the live shows with Gary Barlow as her mentor. In the first week of the live shows, Poole sang Nicki Minaj's "Starships". Despite positive comments, however, she was in the bottom two the following night with controversial "boys" contestant Rylan Clark. Nicole Scherzinger voted against Poole as Clark was in her category, while Gary Barlow and Tulisa voted to eliminate Clark based on the final showdown performance. This meant Walsh had the casting vote, but he appeared unable to make up his mind. After hesitating for some time, he eventually said "I'm going to with Carolynne, I want to keep Carolynne.", although he had to say who wanted to send home, not who he wanted to save. Eventually, after being pressured for an answer by presenter Dermot O'Leary, Walsh made his decision by saying, "I want to take it to deadlock!". O'Leary then revealed that Poole had received the fewest public votes and she was sent home, much to the disgust of Barlow, who stormed off stage and later called Clark a "joke act" and "talentless".

2014–present: Debut album
Following The X Factor, Poole relocated to the United States for five months. She spent time gigging in Arizona and Los Angeles as well as in Nashville, Tennessee, commonly known as the "home of country", where she collaborated with songwriters and producers including Jeff Silbar. In 2014 and 2015, she played at the C2C: Country to Country festival in London. In early 2015, Poole received radio airplay on BBC Radio 2 Country with a song titled "Cupid Must've Been High". Later Poole released her debut single, "I Love You but Shut Up", which features guitar-playing by Albert Lee. The single was play listed on BBC Radio 2, which led to a Terry Wogan session. A tour in support of the single is planned. She will return to play two slots at C2C in March 2016.

Carolynne released her debut 5 song album "Coming Back To Me" on 7 April 2017 and was subsequently nominated for two British Country Music Association Awards.

Acting career
Since 2005, Poole has appeared on stage in pantomime and has also acted in short films. In August 2008, she began shooting her first feature film playing Frankie in The Last Days of Edgar Harding, which was released in 2011. In 2010, she played the role of Sue in Bill Kenwright's UK tour of Dreamboats and Petticoats, and had a minor role in the BBC film Eric and Ernie. In May 2012, Poole appeared in Emmerdale as a girlfriend. She later played Justin Gallagher's new fiancée Talia Brice.

References

External links

  (Archive copy)
 

1980 births
Living people
English women singer-songwriters
British country singers
The X Factor (British TV series) contestants
21st-century English women singers
21st-century English singers
Actresses from Huddersfield
Musicians from Huddersfield